is a passenger railway station in the city of Jōsō, Ibaraki Prefecture, Japan operated by the private railway company Kantō Railway.

Lines

Station layout
The station consists of two opposed side platforms, connected to the station building by a level crossing. The station building also doubles as the private residence of the station master.

Platforms

Adjacent stations

History
Nakatsuma Station was opened on 1 November 1913 as a station on the Jōsō Railroad, which became the Kantō Railway in 1965.

Passenger statistics
In fiscal 2017, the station was used by an average of 133 passengers daily).

Surrounding area
Chiyoda Danchi public housing

See also
 List of railway stations in Japan

References

External links

 Kantō Railway Station Information 

Railway stations in Ibaraki Prefecture
Railway stations in Japan opened in 1913
Jōsō, Ibaraki